The following article presents a summary of the 1945 football (soccer) season in Brazil, which was the 44th season of competitive football in the country.

Campeonato Paulista

São Paulo declared as the Campeonato Paulista champions.

Campeonato Carioca

Vasco da Gama declared as the Campeonato Carioca champions.

State championship champions

Brazil national team
The following table lists all the games played by the Brazil national football team in official competitions and friendly matches during 1945.

References

 Brazilian competitions at RSSSF
 1945 Brazil national team matches at RSSSF

 
Seasons in Brazilian football
Brazil